Roger Federer defeated Marat Safin in the final, 6–1, 6–3, 6–4 to win the singles tennis title at the 2002 Hamburg Masters. It was his first Masters title and the first of an eventual 28 Masters titles. With the win, Federer entered the top ten in rankings for the first time.

Albert Portas was the defending champion, but lost in the first round to Björn Phau.

Seeds
A champion seed is indicated in bold text while text in italics indicates the round in which that seed was eliminated.

Draw

Finals

Top half

Section 1

Section 2

Bottom half

Section 3

Section 4

Qualifying

Qualifying seeds

Qualifiers

Lucky losers

Qualifying draw

First qualifier

Second qualifier

Third qualifier

Fourth qualifier

Fifth qualifier

Sixth qualifier

Seventh qualifier

Eighth qualifier

References

External links
 ITF tournament profile
 Main draw (ATP)
 Qualifying draw (ATP)

2002 ATP Tour